Großhöflein is a market town in eastern Austria, in the state of Burgenland.  It is located near the state capital Eisenstadt.

History
BCE, the area was part of the Celtic kingdom of Noricum.  Under the Roman Empire, today's Großhöflein was in the province of Pannonia.

Like all of Burgenland, Großhöflein was in Hungary until 1920/21.

Population

People 

 Nikolaus Esterházy de Galántha, lived and died here in 1645

Nearby municipalities 
 Kleinhöflein im Burgenland (now a part of Eisenstadt)
 Müllendorf
 Wulkaprodersdorf
 Steinbrunn

See also 

 Weingut Kollwentz (de), a winery

References

Cities and towns in Eisenstadt-Umgebung District